Waku Waku Volley is a series of indoor volleyball video games released for PlayStation and PlayStation 2.  It is a part of the Superlite 2000 series.

The first and PSone game was released in 1998 in Japan and the second was released for PS2 in 2003 in Japan and in Europe with the name Volleyball Xciting.

1998 video games
2003 video games
PlayStation (console) games
PlayStation 2 games
PlayStation Network games
Success (company) games
Video games developed in Japan
Volleyball video games